General Sir John Philip Du Cane,  (5 May 1865 – 5 April 1947) was a British Army officer. He held high rank during the First World War, most notably as Major General Royal Artillery at General Headquarters in 1915 when the British Expeditionary Force (BEF) was expanding rapidly, as General Officer Commanding XV Corps 1916–18, then from April 1918 as liaison officer between Field Marshal Sir Douglas Haig and the Allied Generalissimo Ferdinand Foch. After the war he was Master-General of the Ordnance.

Military career
Du Cane was commissioned a lieutenant in the Royal Artillery in February 1884, promoted to captain on 4 March 1893, and to major on 14 February 1900.

Du Cane served in the Second Boer War, and was appointed a staff officer for lines of communication in South Africa in September 1900. Following the end of hostilities in early June 1902, he left Cape Town on board the SS Assaye, and arrived at Southampton the next month. He was mentioned in despatches and received a brevet promotion to lieutenant colonel in the South Africa honours list published on 26 June 1902.

He then served at the Staff College, Camberley, as Deputy Assistant Adjutant General from 1905−1907.

Du Cane  became Commander Royal Artillery for 3rd Division in 1911.

Du Cane  served in the First World War initially as a brigadier general on the General Staff of III Corps. In 1915, as Major General Royal Artillery, he was Artillery Advisor at General Headquarters; William Robertson, Chief of Staff to the BEF in 1915, later stated that he had laid the organisational groundwork for the massive expansion of BEF artillery during the war. He was posted to the Ministry of Munitions in 1916 and then became General Officer Commanding XV Corps in 1916. In that capacity, he was closely involved in Operation Hush, a planned invasion on the Belgian coast. On 12 April 1918, against the backdrop of the German "Georgette" Offensive and Field Marshal Sir Douglas Haig's demands for French reinforcements, he was appointed liaison officer between Haig and the Allied Generalissimo General Foch.

After the war, Du Cane made his home in London at 4 Upper Brook Street, Mayfair. Du Cane  was appointed Master-General of the Ordnance in 1920 and then General Officer Commanding-in-Chief for Western Command in 1923. He was General Officer Commanding-in-Chief for British Army of the Rhine from 1924 until 1927 when he became Governor and Commander-in-Chief of Malta. He was also Aide-de-Camp General to the King from 1926 to 1930. He retired in 1931.

References

Books
 Harris, J.P. Douglas Haig and the First World War. Cambridge, Cambridge University Press, 2008. 
 

|-
 

|-
 

|-

|-

1865 births
1947 deaths
British Army generals
British Army generals of World War I
Knights Grand Cross of the Order of the Bath
Royal Artillery officers
British Army personnel of the Second Boer War
People from South Kensington
Governors and Governors-General of Malta
Conservative Party (UK) parliamentary candidates
Military personnel from London
Academics of the Staff College, Camberley